Écailles de lune is the second studio album by French blackgaze band Alcest, released on March 26, 2010 by Prophecy Productions. It is the first Alcest album featuring Winterhalter on drums. Although it continues in the direction started with the first album Souvenirs d'un autre monde, Écailles de lune marks a darker, louder transition into shoegazing, while also coming back to the band's black metal origins as it features harsh vocals like those found on their second release Le Secret.

Alcest mastermind Neige said of the album's concept, "This story isn't really a metaphor of death, as it would seem to be. For me, it is about a man who decides to leave one world for another one, literally. Like a passage to another reality, another state of existence... This time I was especially inspired by the seaside, the energy and the exaltation you can feel when you sit in front of the sea at night. It appears terribly fascinating, full of secrets and scary at the same time." "Solar Song" is sung in glossolalia, and "Sur l'océan couleur de fer" is a musical version of the poem by Paul-Jean Toulet. "Abysses" was written and performed in its entirety by Fursy Teyssier of Les Discrets, who also created the album's artwork.

Critical reception

The album received positive reviews upon release. Ned Raggett of AllMusic gave the album four stars out of five, and in particular praised Neige's vocal performance, writing that "Neige's singing is some of his loveliest at many points throughout the album, a soft keen toward the middle of the second half of the title track, a low and contemplative rumination elsewhere – if not notably different from his earlier work in approach, it's at its most enjoyable here, and perhaps at its most beautifully serene on 'Solar Song', vocals overlaid to lovely effect."

Invisible Oranges praised the album, concluding that, "Sometimes the things you love don't need or don't benefit from explanation. The singularity of purpose oozes off this album – you just get it. Lead guitarist and compositional lynchpin Neige says Alcest is his way of musically translating an 'indescribably beautiful haven' that he first perceived as a child. That seems to be the common thread between the artists Alcest allegedly hybridize, My Bloody Valentine and Burzum: a single-minded longing for alternate realities. Kudos to Alcest for bridging musical worlds by listening to their heart."

Track listing

Release history

Personnel
 Alcest
 Neige – lead and backing vocals, guitars, bass, keyboards
 Winterhalter – drums

 Additional personnel
 Fursy Teyssier – all instruments on "Abysses", cover art
 Markus Stock – recording
 Neb Xort – mixing, mastering
 Martin Koller – producer

References

2010 albums
Alcest albums